The masonry arch bridges of stone or brick are the most genuine of arch bridges, some lasting a thousand years. Because they are made of worked stone, there is a slight chance they might even stand without mortar, like the Pont du Gard aqueduct. Yet arch bridges using rough hewn stones like Changhong Bridge need mortar to stand. Arches with a core of reinforced concrete covered by facade stone for decoration are not to be included in this list, the load-bearing part of the arch should be cut stone or brick, or as follows, unreinforced concrete.

In a closed spandrel stone arch bridge the hollow space can be filled with rubble and loose material. It can also be filled with concrete, in which case the filling itself become able to bear load in addition to the load carried by the ring of voussoirs. If the voussoir stones are thin they can not take a lot of weight so instead it is the concrete filling that becomes the structural part of the arch. The next step is to remove the voussoir stones completely, or only use them as facade stones. An unreinforced concrete arch is technically a masonry arch that use only very small stones, that is the aggregate of the concrete, sand and gravel. Such an arch would not stand without mortar.

Some modern bridges are built masonry style with precast concrete blocks, like Gladesville Bridge that has a span of 305 metres (1000 ft). These types are not in this list because their blocks are most likely made of reinforced concrete, that may make the assembled arch to have more in common with a modern reinforced concrete arch than a stone masonry arch.

The Maidenhead Railway Bridge may have the two longest arches made of bricks, .

Building new masonry arch bridges today is a solely Chinese business. There are 18 stone arch bridges with spans exceeding . There are probably several dozens of stone arches exceeding 40m in the Fujian province only. Almost all bridges were built after 1950.

This list contains the longest masonry arch spans ever built being at least .

See also

 
 
 List of longest arch bridge spans
 List of spans (list of remarkable permanent wire spans)

References
 Structurae.com, International Database for Civil and Structural Engineering 

 Others references

Further reading
 
 

Arch,masonry,longest
Bridges, masonry arch
Bridges,Arch
Bridges,Masonry arch,longest